This is a list of Muisca and pre-Muisca archaeological sites; sites on the Altiplano Cundiboyacense, where archaeological evidence has been discovered of the Muisca and their ancestors of the Herrera, preceramic and prehistorical periods.

Over the course of the centuries and mainly in the 21st century, many sites with evidences of Muisca and pre-Muisca presence have been found and reported.

The possibly oldest evidence of human settlement in the Eastern Ranges of the Colombian Andes has been discovered just west of the former Muisca territories, at Pubenza in Tocaima, Cundinamarca. Eight stone tools have been found with bone remains, consisting of among others Haplomastodon and turtles, which have been dated at 16,400 ± 420 years BP. Due to the location at an inundated platform, it is unclear if the bones and thus age were in situ.


Background 

The Altiplano Cundiboyacense, with its valleys of Sogamoso-Duitama, Tunja and Ubaté-Chiquinquirá and the southeastern flatlands of the Bogotá savanna, as well as the Tenza Valley to the east, was inhabited for 12,000 years by indigenous peoples.

While various classifications of the archaeological history of the Andean high plateau exist, the most commonly accepted sequence, in years BP, is shown to the right.

Timeline of inhabitation

List of Muisca and pre-Muisca sites

See also 

List of Muisca research institutes,  archaeological sites in Colombia
Muisca art
Muisca Confederation, economy
Lake Guatavita, Tota, Iguaque, Suesca, Fúquene, Siecha Lakes, Tequendama Falls
List of Maya sites

References

Bibliography

Further reading 
 
 
 

 
Sites
Muisca